Timothy James Freedman (25 November 1964) is an Australian musician, best known as the mainstay lead singer and keyboardist of the Australian band The Whitlams formed in 1993. The song "No Aphrodisiac", co-written by Freedman, was their break-through hit in 1997; their top four ARIA albums by sales are Love This City (1999), Torch the Moon (2002), Little Cloud (2006), and their compilation album Truth, Beauty and a Picture of You: Best of the Whitlams in 2008.

A highlight of his career was receiving an ARIA Music Award for 'Song of the Year' in 1998 from the former Australian prime minister Gough Whitlam—after whom his band is named.

Biography

Tim Freedman was born in 1964 in Sydney and was raised in Collaroy, in Sydney's Northern Beaches region, and was educated at the Shore School in North Sydney. Prior to co-founding The Whitlams, Freedman was the front man of ska band Itchy Feet, and later the indie pop bands Penguins on Safari and The Olive Branch. He had stints as sideman with Sunnyboys 1986–87 (who he would later manage), and The Hummingbirds 1989–90.

At the Gimme Ted benefit concert on 10 March 2001, Freedman performed his cover version of two songs, "Julia" and "Falling in Love Again", originally by Ted Mulry. In an interview, which aired on 612 ABC Brisbane on Friday 29 September 2006, Freedman said he became a pianist "by mistake" after quitting law school.  He later completed a Bachelor of Arts at The University of Sydney.

Since late 2006, Tim has been the host of the music chat show The Tim Freedman Sunday Session at 6pm, airing Sunday nights on the Sydney radio station Vega 95.3 (now known as Smooth FM).

In 2014, he started writing as a music critic for a newly founded print and digital newspaper, The Saturday Paper, to help support the paper's growth, which has since grown to a circulation of 900,000 as of 2021.

Discography

Solo
 Australian Idle (2011)

The Whitlams

 Introducing The Whitlams (1993) 
 Undeniably The Whitlams (1995) 
 Eternal Nightcap (1997)
 Love This City (1999)
 Torch the Moon (2002)
 Little Cloud (2006)
 Sancho (2022)

References

1964 births
Living people
People educated at Sydney Church of England Grammar School
Australian pianists
The Whitlams members
21st-century pianists